Kevin White may refer to:

Kevin White (American football) (born 1992), American football player
Kevin White (athletic director) (born 1950), athletic director of Duke University
Kevin White (basketball) (born 1987), Australian basketball player
Kevin White (cricketer) (born 1958), New Zealand cricketer
Kevin White (darts player), Australian darts player
Kevin White (footballer) (born 1933), Australian footballer 
Kevin White (politician) (1929–2012), mayor of Boston 1968–1984
Kevin White (skateboarder), (born 1993), American skateboarder
Kevin White, former guitarist for the band General Public
Kevin White, former guitarist for the band Rise Against